This is a list of records and statistics of the AFC Asian Cup.

General statistics by tournament
Source:

Debut of national teams

Overall team records
In this ranking 3 points are awarded for a win, 1 for a draw and 0 for a loss. As per statistical convention in football, matches decided in extra time are counted as wins and losses, while matches decided by penalty shoot-outs are counted as draws. Teams are ranked by total points, then by goal difference, then by goals scored.

Medal table

Comprehensive team results by tournament
Legend

 – Champions
 – Runners-up
 – Third place
 – Fourth place
 – Semi-finals
QF – Quarter-finals
R16 – Round of 16
GS – Group stage

Q – Qualified for upcoming tournament
 — Qualified but withdrew / Disqualified after qualification
 — Did not qualify
 — Did not enter / Withdrew from the Asian Cup
 — Hosts

For each tournament, the number of teams in each finals tournament are shown (in parentheses).

Results of host nations

Results of defending finalists

Teams yet to qualify for finals

The following thirteen teams which are current AFC members and one team not AFC member have never qualified for the Asian Cup.

Legend
 – Did not qualify
 – Did not enter / Withdrew / Banned

For each tournament, the number of teams in each finals tournament are shown (in parentheses).

Notes:
1

Longest active AFC Asian Cup droughts
This is a list of droughts associated with the participation of national teams in the AFC Asian Cup.
Does not include teams that have not yet made their first appearance, teams that no longer exist or teams that are no longer members of AFC.

Previous droughts
Updated to 15 June 2022, including qualification for the 2023 AFC Asian Cup. Does not include teams that have not yet made their first appearance or teams that no longer exist.

4 Considering South Vietnam's results are attributed to unified Vietnam.

Other records
Only three teams have won the tournament in their debut appearances:
 South Korea (1956)
 Iran (1968)
 Saudi Arabia (1984)
Iran hold the record for the most games played, with 68.
Only Iran have won three consecutive finals of the AFC Asian Cup.

Individual records

Most Valuable Player
Source:

Overall top goalscorers
Players in bold are still active at international level.

Top goalscorers in one tournament
Players in bold are still active at international level.

Hat-tricks

Most tournament wins

Most tournament appearances
The table lists the players who have appeared four or more times in the tournament.

Younis Mahmoud is the only player in the history of the tournament to score a goal in four separate tournaments.

Source:

Fastest goals scored from kick-off
Only three goals in the history of the tournament have been scored in the first minute of their respective games.

 Ali Mabkhout (against Bahrain) at the 2015 edition in 14 seconds
 Fathi Kameel (against China PR) at the 1976 edition in 20 seconds
 Xie Yuxin (against Japan) at the 1992 edition in 20 seconds

Source:

Match records

Attendance by year

Highest attendance
The highest ever attendance officially recorded was of 100,000 during the 1976 AFC Asian Cup final between Iran and Kuwait.

Lowest attendance
The lowest ever attendance officially recorded was of 300 during the 1980 AFC Asian Cup group game between North Korea and Bangladesh.

Awards

Team of the Tournament

Fair play award
 First awarded in 1984

References

External links
AFC Asian Cup official history book
Official website at AFC.com
RSSSF archive